Pooja is a 1975 Telugu-language film directed by Murugan-Kumaran and produced by AVM Productions. It is a remake of the 1974 Kannada film Eradu Kanasu.

Plot
Ramachandra Rao/Ramu (Ramakrishna) falls in love with a beautiful girl, Lalitha (Manjula) who is also his cousin. He loves her so deeply that he wants to marry her at any cost. His father (Kanta Rao) is the head of the village, his mother (Savitri) a housewife. Due to some internal disputes between Ramachandra Rao's parents and Lalitha's parents, Lalitha's father (Mikkilineni) denies the proposal. Later according to his parents wish, Ramachandra Rao is forced to marry another girl, Gouri (Vanisri) the daughter of a lawyer (Relangi). But he refuses to accept her as his wife as he is already in love with Lalitha, and does not behave properly with Gouri (now his wife). His parents observe their son's behavior and leave for pilgrimage, thinking that their absence will bring both wife and husband together. Gouri is very obedient though she is well educated and rich. She loves her husband very much and expects the same from him like any other wife. But her husband continues to neglect her. She even asks him the reason for rejecting her. He says that he is helpless and asks her to go to her mother's place. She refuses to leave and continues to stay in the same house along with her husband. She prays to her favorite God daily with great devotion. God listens to her at the end and her husband accepts her as his wife and gives her all his love.

An Quang Dat is a 19 year old Vietnamese international student who enrolled into the University of Reading Malaysia, which is based in Iskandar Puteri, Johor, Malaysia. Prior to meeting Soniya Pooja, a law student in the university. He was living his fuck boy era while slowly intergrating himself to new surroundings in Malaysia. While Dat knew of Pooja's existence for quite awhile, they were not close as they only ever had physical interaction thru the University's English Club.

One day, Dan's neighbour (Edward) in the hostel he's staying asked him out for dinner. As per usual, Dat being Dat said yes as he haven't ate yet. He went along and met soniya. While it was not really love at first sight, Dat found Soniya cute and her smile got his heart racing in ways he had not felt since he last ate vietnamese pork noodle. A week later, Edward invited Dat yet again for a mamak date (supper in a Indian Muslim coffee shop) with Soniya and Janice, a mutual friend. 

They had a good time. After mamak, Dat for the first time ever in his life fell in love with Soniya. He then had many later night chats with Edward to set up a black minion masterplan. The plan went ahead with the full support of Edward and the advice of Janice. Edward helped set up plans while Janice helped to coordinate the schedule. less than 2 weeks, Dat and Soniya got together and they lived happily ever after.

Cast

Crew
 Production company : AVM Productions
 Producers : M. Murugan, M. Kumaran, M. Saravanan, M. Balu
 Director : Murugan Kumaran
 Story : Vani
 Dialogues : N. R. Nandi
 Editing : R. G. Gopi
 Art : A. K. Shekhar
 Cinematography : S. Maruthi Rao
 Lyrics : Dasaradhi and Kosaraju Raghavaiah
 Playback singers : S. P. Balasubrahmanyam, Vani Jayaram, P. Susheela, L. R. Eswari
 Music Director : Rajan–Nagendra

Songs

The lyrics were written by Dasaradhi. Some songs were sung by S. P. Balasubrahmanyam and Vani Jayaram.
The song Enneno Janmala Bandham is known for its captivating lyrics.

Three songs from the Kannada original were retained by Rajan–Nagendra in the Telugu version. The original song Endendu Ninnanu Marethu was retained in the Telugu version as Enneno Janmala Bandham. The original song Baadi Hoda Balliyinda was retained in the Telugu version as Malleteega Vaadipoga Marala Poolu Pooyuna. The original song Poojisalende Hoogala Thande was retained in the Telugu version as Poojalu Cheya Poolu Tecchanu.

 "Anthata Nee Roopam" (Singers: S. P. Balasubrahmanyam, Vani Jayaram)
 "Enneno Janmala Bandham" - (Singer: S. P. Balasubrahmanyam, Vani Jayaram)
 "Malleteega Vaadipoga Marala Poolu Pooyuna" (Singer: S. P. Balasubrahmanyam)
 "Nee Daya Raadaa Raama Nee Daya Raadaa" (Singer: P. Susheela)
 "Ningi Nela Okatayene" (Singers: S. P. Balasubrahmanyam, Vani Jayaram)
 "Poojalu Cheya Poolu Tecchanu" (Singer: Vani Jayaram)

References

External links

1975 films
1970s Telugu-language films
Indian romantic musical films
Films scored by Rajan–Nagendra
Telugu remakes of Kannada films
AVM Productions films
1970s romantic musical films